Roti tissue, roti tisu, or tisu prata is a sweet flatbread often sold at Mamak stalls in Malaysia and Singapore. It is also known as "roti helikopter" (helicopter bread) or Masala Dosa. Roti tisu is a thinner and crispier version of the traditional roti canai/prata, as thin as a piece of 40–50 cm round-shaped tissue. The finishing touches to the making of roti tisu require skills, and they depend on the creativity of the maker.

Roti tisu is available at most local Mamak stalls in Malaysia and Singapore and may be coated with sweet substances such as sugar and kaya (jam) or eaten with condiments such as ice cream.

The popularity of roti tissue has spread to neighbouring Indonesia, where it is found as street food in areas with significant Malays and Indian-Indonesian communities.

See also
 Mamak stall

References

Indonesian breads
Malaysian breads
Singaporean cuisine
Flatbreads
Malaysian pastries